Ipca Laboratories Limited is an Indian multinational pharmaceutical company based in Mumbai. It produces theobromine, acetylthiophene, and p-bromotoluene as active pharmaceutical ingredients (APIs). Ipca sells these APIs and their intermediates globally. It produces more than 150 formulations that include oral liquids, tablets, dry powders, and capsules.

History
It was founded by group of businessmen and medical professionals in 1949. In 1975, the management of the company was taken over by Amitabh Bachchan, Ajitabh Bachchan, Jaya Bachchan, M.R. Chandurkar, P.C. Godha. In 1997, the Bachchan family sold their 36% holding in Ipca Laboratories to, at the time, the company's four whole time directors.

In 2004, Forbes selected Ipca, for the second consecutive year as one among the first 200 'Best under a billion company' in Asia.

It also got certification from US Food and Drug Administration (FDA), UK-Medicines and Healthcare products Regulatory Agency (MHRA), South Africa-Medicines Control Council (MCC), Brazil-Brazilian National Health Vigilance Agency (ANVISA) and Australia-Therapeutic Goods Administration (TGA). On 29 Jan 2016 the FDA issued a warning letter, WL: 320-16-07, for failure to comply with good manufacturing processes (GMP) under section 21 of the code of federal regulations (21 CFR).

Products and operations
The various kinds of drug intermediates that the company manufactures include theobromine, acetylthiophene, and p-bromotoluene. It is present in over 36 countries of Asia, Africa, CIS, and South America, including Cambodia, Kazakhstan, Kenya, Mauritius, Myanmar, Nigeria, Oman, Russia, Sri Lanka, Sudan, Tanzania, Ukraine, Vietnam and Yemen. The main activities of company are to produce and market pharmaceuticals and drugs. The various products of the company include formulations, drug intermediates, and active pharmaceutical ingredients (API).

References

Manufacturing companies based in Mumbai
Pharmaceutical companies of India
Pharmaceutical companies established in 1949
Indian companies established in 1949
Companies listed on the National Stock Exchange of India
Companies listed on the Bombay Stock Exchange